Mount Smythe is a mountain in Jasper National Park, Alberta, Canada. 

The mountain was named after Francis Sydney Smythe, an international mountaineer who climbed in the Himalayas, Alps and the Canadian Rockies.

Geology
Mount Smythe is composed of sedimentary rock laid down during the Precambrian to Jurassic periods. Formed in shallow seas, this sedimentary rock was pushed east and over the top of younger rock during the Laramide orogeny.

Climate
Based on the Köppen climate classification, Mount Smythe is located in a subarctic climate with cold, snowy winters, and mild summers.

See also
List of mountains in the Canadian Rockies

References

External links
 Mt. Smythe photo: Flickr

Three-thousanders of Alberta
Winston Churchill Range
Mountains of Jasper National Park
Canadian Rockies